Heteragrion is a genus of damselflies in the family Heteragrionidae.

The genus contains the following species:

References

Taxa named by Edmond de Sélys Longchamps
Zygoptera genera
Taxonomy articles created by Polbot